Garrett Robert McIntyre (born November 26, 1984) is a former American football linebacker. McIntyre is of Scottish ancestry. He was signed as an undrafted free agent by the Seattle Seahawks in 2006. He played college football at Fresno State.

He was also a member of the Arizona Cardinals, Tennessee Titans, San Jose SaberCats, Hamilton Tiger-Cats, and New York Jets.

Professional career

Seattle Seahawks
After going undrafted in the 2006 NFL Draft, McIntyre signed with the Seattle Seahawks as an undrafted free agent on May 1, 2006. He was cut on June 2, 2006.

Arizona Cardinals
McIntyre was signed by the Arizona Cardinals on August 15, 2006. He was waived a week later on August 21.

Tennessee Titans
He was claimed off waivers by the Tennessee Titans on August 22, 2006. He was cut on September 5, 2006.

San Jose SaberCats
McIntyre signed with the San Jose SaberCats of the Arena Football League on February 4, 2007. He was placed on injured reserved on April 20, 2007. He appeared in games for the team from 2008 to 2009.

Hamilton Tiger-Cats
McIntyre played for the Hamilton Tiger-Cats of the Canadian Football League from 2009 to 2010.

New York Jets
McIntyre was signed by the New York Jets to a future contract on January 26, 2011.

McIntyre made his NFL debut on special teams for the Jets, in their season opener against the Dallas Cowboys at home.  In the fourth quarter, he can be seen blocking two Dallas lineman at once, opening a path for running back Joe McKnight to block a punt, which was returned for a touchdown.  This event shifted the momentum in the Jets' favor, and led them to a comeback victory. McIntyre started the first game of his career against the Denver Broncos on November 17, 2011.

McIntyre was released on August 30, 2014.

References

External links
Fresno State Bulldogs bio
New York Jets bio

1984 births
Living people
American football linebackers
Canadian football linebackers
American players of Canadian football
Fresno State Bulldogs football players
San Jose SaberCats players
Sportspeople from Greater Sacramento
Hamilton Tiger-Cats players
New York Jets players
Players of American football from California
People from South Lake Tahoe, California